Jack Arthur Davenport (born 1 March 1973) is an English-American actor. He is best known for his roles in the television series This Life and Coupling, and as James Norrington in the Pirates of the Caribbean series. He has also appeared in other Hollywood films, such as The Talented Mr. Ripley and Kingsman: The Secret Service.

On television, Davenport is known for his roles in the ensemble drama series FlashForward, Smash, and The Morning Show as well as his leading role in the 2013 ITV drama series Breathless.

Early life 
Davenport, the son of actor Nigel Davenport and actress Maria Aitken, was born in Wimbledon, London, and lived in Ibiza, Spain, for the first seven years of his life. His uncle is writer and former Conservative MP Jonathan Aitken, his maternal grandmother was socialite Penelope Aitken, his maternal grandfather was politician William Aitken, and one of his maternal great-grandfathers was John Maffey, 1st Baron Rugby. Through Jonathan Aitken's marriage to Elizabeth Rees-Williams, Davenport is also related to Jared Harris and Jamie Harris, her sons from her marriage to Richard Harris. His parents divorced when he was seven, at which point he was sent to the independent Dragon School in Oxford, as his parents did not want him to become involved in the divorce proceedings. He then went on to attend Cheltenham College, a boarding independent school for boys (now co-educational), in the spa town of Cheltenham in Gloucestershire, in the West of England, followed by the British American Drama Academy in London.

Career 
Davenport had not planned to become an actor; however, his career began when he took a gap year after attending Cheltenham College. A director from Theatr Clwyd was impressed by his performance in a summer drama course and asked Davenport to work for him. Aged 18 he was in Wales, performing bit parts in Hamlet, where he became friends with Rhys Ifans.

The following year, he attended the University of East Anglia (UEA), concentrating in Film Studies and English Literature. He tried acting once more at the UEA but was not, at this point, particularly interested in it. Davenport had considered becoming a member of a film crew, as opposed to acting in front of the camera. His mother advised him, after his graduation from UEA, to write to John Cleese requesting work on the set of his upcoming film, Fierce Creatures, so that Davenport could gain some experience behind the camera. Cleese instead sent Davenport's letter to the casting department, and he was subsequently cast as a trainee zookeeper. Whilst a small part with few lines it provided his first opportunity to work in front of the camera. After the production of Fierce Creatures was completed, Davenport found an agent who secured him an audition for the role of Miles Stewart in the BBC television drama series This Life.

Since then Davenport has played roles in many successful films and TV series, including The Talented Mr. Ripley, Coupling and Ultraviolet, as well as the box office smash Pirates of the Caribbean: The Curse of the Black Pearl, and its sequels, Dead Man's Chest and At World's End.

During his career Davenport has also performed voice-overs, having narrated the audio versions of John Buchan's The Thirty-Nine Steps and recorded parts in Anthony Burgess's A Clockwork Orange. He also provides the voice over for the British MasterCard advertisements (the American being done by Billy Crudup).

In 2006, he featured in the ITV1 drama The Incredible Journey of Mary Bryant and in 2009 starred in the film The Boat That Rocked.

In 2007 Davenport was cast in Swingtown, a period and relationship drama for CBS about the impact of sexual and social liberation in 1970s American suburban households, with story arcs involving open marriages and key parties. This was cancelled after one season.

In 2008, Davenport was cast in the ABC pilot FlashForward, which was based on a Robert J. Sawyer novel. In the series, Davenport played the character of Lloyd Simcoe, a physicist allegedly responsible for a worldwide blackout, which causes the whole world to see the future. The series was cancelled after a single season.

In February 2011, Davenport was cast in the NBC musical drama pilot Smash. It ran for two seasons and is now a cult favorite on streaming services. The first season of the series follows a group of people coming together to put on a Marilyn Monroe musical on Broadway. Davenport plays the musical's director. The second season expands as the various cast members branch out into other productions; Davenport's character, Derek Wills, quits the Broadway production of Bombshell to pursue a small off-Broadway musical and take it to Broadway with his protégé, Karen Cartwright (Katharine McPhee). The season ends with the two shows competing at the Tonys.

Davenport also starred as the replacement singer in the video for Snow Patrol's single "Called Out in the Dark", released on YouTube on 17 August 2011, alongside Tara Summers and Gary Lightbody.

2018 saw Davenport's Broadway debut playing the Earl of Warwick in a revival of George Bernard Shaw's Saint Joan starring Condola Rashad.

Personal life
Davenport married actress Michelle Gomez on 1 May 2000. Their son, Harry, was born in 2010. On 28 February 2023, Gomez announced on Instagram that she, Davenport, and their son became naturalized American citizens.

Filmography

Film

Television

Theatre

Radio
 Alistair Cooke's American Journey (2006) (BBC Radio 4)
 Jack Davenport reads The Raw Shark Texts by Steven Hall

Awards and nominations

References

External links 

1973 births
Living people
People from Wimbledon, London
Aitken family
People educated at The Dragon School
People educated at Cheltenham College
Alumni of the University of East Anglia
English male film actors
English male stage actors
English male television actors
English people of Scottish descent
English people of Canadian descent
20th-century English male actors
21st-century English male actors
Alumni of the British American Drama Academy